Li Dazhao or Li Ta-chao (October 29, 1889 – April 28, 1927) was a Chinese intellectual and revolutionary who participated in the New Cultural Movement in the early years of the Republic of China, established in 1912. He co-founded the Chinese Communist Party (CCP) with Chen Duxiu in July 1921. He helped build a united front between the CCP and Sun Yat-sen's Nationalist Party (KMT) in early 1924. During the Northern Expedition, Li was arrested and then executed by warlord Zhang Zuolin in Beijing in 1927.

Biography

Early life 
Li was born into a peasant family in Laoting County, Hebei (previously Zhili) province in 1889. His childhood was miserable. His father died a few months before he was born, and his mother died when he was a baby. At the age of ten, Li married Zhao Renlan, who was nearly six years older; Li's foster grandfather arranged the marriage for Li's protection. He received his traditional education in three village schools in Laoting County for a decade.<ref>Tangshanshiweidangshiyanjiushi, Li Dazhao yu guxiang (Li Dazhao and his hometown), Beijing: Zhongyangwenxianchubanshe, 1994, pp. 1-90.</ref> He started his modern education at Yongpingfu Middle school in 1905. From 1907 to 1913, he completed his college education at Beiyang College of Law and Politics in Tianjin. From 1914 to 1916, Li enrolled as a student at Waseda University in Tokyo, Japan before returning to China in 1916. While there he lived in a YMCA dormitory and participated in Bible studies at the church of Yasuzo Shimizu. He did not finish his learning as he was expelled by Waseda due to his long absence from his classes for his active participation in the campaign against Yuan Shikai's imperial endeavors, during which he even returned to Shanghai in early 1916.

 Head Librarian and Professor at Peking University 

After returning to China, Li served as an editor in Beijing for a few newspapers on which he published numerous articles to promote democracy, freedom, constitutional rule, and national resurgence. As a leading intellectual in the New Culture Movement, he lashed out at China's feudal tradition, criticized the old tyrannical past, and strongly endorsed the representative system. In January 1918, Li was hired by Cai Yuanpei to be the head of the library at Peking University (Beijing University) and a couple of years later he became a professor of politics, history, and economics there. He taught many different courses not only at Beijing University, but also at four other universities in Beijing. He was invited as a speaker by associations, colleges, and other organizations throughout China. At Beijing University, he influenced students during the May Fourth Movement of May 4, 1919; this including Mao Zedong, who worked as an assistant in the library's reading room. In a number of ways, "Li's urgent calls for democracy, science, and constitutional rule are an essential component of the brilliance of the May Fourth Movement."

More importantly, Li Dazhao was a prominent leader during the May Fourth Movement; he advised and coached young students in Beijing to take action against the Beiyang government and to protest against the imperialist powers' decision at the Paris Peace Conference in 1919 to transfer the former German colonial privileges in Shandong to the Japanese Empire. During this time he published productively on a variety of topics championing new and progressive ideas, and became China's earliest self-converted communist. Li was the first Chinese intellectual to stress the importance of China's rural society in launching political movements. He was one of the earliest scholars to explore the Bolshevik government in the Soviet Union as a possible model for his own nation. Throughout his life, Li maintained cordial relationship with other New Culture Movement figures such as Hu Shi and Lu Xun, even though they had diverse scholarly opinions and assumed different political stances.

 Co-founder of the Chinese Communist Party 
By many accounts, Li was a nationalist and believed that the Chinese nation could enjoy a renaissance by accepting a new culture, by rejuvenating its people, and by remolding its civilization. It is interesting to note that Li admired America for years but changed that attitude to be a pro-Russian intellectual in 1919. He viewed the peasants in China as an important player in China's political and social changes. Like other intellectuals of his time, Li's thinking was impacted by diverse elements such as Kropotkin's anarchism. After the May Fourth Movement, he and other intellectuals started to turn to Marxism. The success of the Bolshevik Revolution was a factor in remolding his political views.

Later, Li combined his original nationalist thoughts and his newly acquired Marxist views to fashion his political visions for national salvation. Recent studies demonstrate that Li mainly read communism-related works from the Japanese sources which helped deepen his understanding of the communist ideology. 

Although some piecemeal articles referencing Marxism had been published in China previously, in 1918 Li became the first person in China to spread Marxism through significant published articles.

Li initiated the Peking Socialist Youth Corps in 1920. He built China's earliest socialist and communist groups in Beijing even before the establishment of the Chinese Communist Party in Shanghai. Li was unable to attend the party's first national congress in July 1921, but he and Chen Duxiu
- another absentee - were regarded as co-founders of the party.

The United Front with Sun Yat-sen's Nationalist Party
Under the leadership of Li and Chen, the CCP developed a close relationship with the Soviet controlled Comintern. After the establishment of the CCP, Li and other early communists worked diligently to mobilize Chinese railway and mining workers to fight for their own rights. Directed by the Comintern, Li and Chen joined the Nationalist Party in 1922 and forged a close tie with Sun Yat-sen. Li was elected to the KMT's Central Executive Committee in Guangzhou (Canton) in January 1924, which marked the formal formation of the first united front between the Communist Party and the Nationalist Party. Both parties worked together to fight against their common enemies: the warlord government in Beijing and imperialist powers which dominated many spheres of influence in China. Li visited the Soviet Union in late 1924 and stayed there for months. Upon his return from Russia, he wooed Christian warlord Feng Yuxiang to the Nationalist side, recruited young people into the two political parties, and organized numerous revolutionary activities. He urged Feng Yuxiang to adopt a strategy to fight against Zhang Zuolin from Northwestern China to Henan Province, which was crucial for the success of the Northern Expedition to topple down the warlord regime in Beijing.

 Death 
Tension between the Comintern and the CCP on one side and the KMT on another led to political intrigue, especially after Sun Yat-sen's death in 1925. In any case, Li was instrumental in the United Front of the two political parties for which he served as its leader in North China. He helped organize anti-government demonstrations, in particular on March 18, 1926, in which government guards fired into the crowd, killing forty-seven people and wounding more than 200. After the March 18 Massacre, Li was put on the Beiyang government's list of the most wanted. He took refuge in the Soviet Embassy in Beijing yet continued to lead political maneuvers in North China to topple the warlord government. When the United Front collapsed in 1927, Zhang Zuolin of the Fengtian clique ordered a raid on the Embassy, violating diplomatic immunity. Li, his wife and daughter were jailed, but his wife and daughter were released. Zhang ordered Li and nineteen other individuals, both Nationalists and Communists, to be executed by strangulation on April 28, 1927. 

Legacy

Li Dazhao left an enduring legacy upon modern Chinese history. As a leading intellectual of China's New Cultural Movement, he wrote hundreds of articles to promote democracy, support constitutional government, endorse individual freedom, and called for a national revival. His ideological world might be complex as he incorporated diverse thoughts. His turn to communism was dramatic; from 1918 to 1919, he became China's first communist, about a year earlier than Chen Duxiu.

Li's thoughts on the role of peasants heavily influenced Mao Zedong. As one of the co-founders of the CCP, Li's key role in decision-making for early communist activities and in bringing forth new theories significantly impacted the initial stage of the Chinese communist revolution. In a particular sense, Li Dazhao was a special bridge between the first two generations of the communist leadership; Maurice Meisner remarked that Li Dazhao was the CCP's "first true leader and its greatest martyr" and that he "represents the link between the older generation of democratically oriented and Western-educated intellectuals of the early phase of the New Cultural Movement (ca. 1915–1919), from whom the first Chinese Marxists emerged, and the new generation of young Communist intellectuals who inherited the party leadership after 1927."

Family
Spouse: 
 Zhao Renlan (1884–1933).
Children: 
 Li Baohua (1909–2005) served as the governor of the People's Bank of China from 1978 to 1982.
 Li Xinghua (1911–1979)
 Li Yanhua
 Li Guanghua
 Li Xinhua

 References 
 Citations 

 Sources 

 Original text based on marxists.org article, released under the GNU FDL.''

External links 
 

1889 births
1927 deaths
Chinese librarians
Chinese Marxists
Chinese revolutionaries
Delegates to the 3rd National Congress of the Chinese Communist Party
Members of the 2nd Central Executive Committee of the Chinese Communist Party
Members of the 4th Central Executive Committee of the Chinese Communist Party
Academic staff of Peking University
People executed by the Republic of China by hanging
People from Laoting County
People from Tangshan
Political party founders
Waseda University alumni